Lyon Park is an urban park located in and administered by the city of Wisconsin Rapids, Wisconsin.

Lyon Park has the name of Clark Lyon, a local landowner. The riverfront park is adjacent to Ben Hansen Park.

References

Geography of Wood County, Wisconsin
Parks in Wisconsin
Wisconsin Rapids, Wisconsin